Lyle Arnold Berman (born August 6, 1941, in Minneapolis, Minnesota) is an American professional poker player and business executive.

Business
Berman grew up in Minnesota and attended the University of Minnesota where he was graduated in 1964 with a degree in business administration.  He then went to work for his father's leather business, Berman Buckskin.  When the business was sold to W. R. Grace in 1979, he stayed on as president and CEO.  The company was then later sold to the Melville Corporation where it became Wilsons Leather.  From 1994 to 2000 he was the chairman and CEO of the Rainforest Cafe chain of restaurants and retail stores.

Berman also played an important role in gaming companies.  In 1990 he was a co-founder of Grand Casinos, a company that sought to create gambling establishments outside of Las Vegas and Atlantic City.  Grand Casinos' Native American casino holdings were spun off into a new company, Lakes Entertainment, and Berman was named CEO.  Additionally, Berman is the chairman of the board of the World Poker Tour and Pokertek.

He won the B'nai B'rith Great American Traditions award in 1995 and the Gaming Executive of the Year award in 1996.

Berman was one of the many investors victimized by the massive Ponzi scheme of Bernie Madoff, though his actual losses are unknown.

Poker
Berman has won 3 World Series of Poker (WSOP) bracelets and is a member of the Poker Hall of Fame.

In 2005, Lyle Berman competed in the National Heads Up Championship. He finished in fifth place losing to eventual champion Phil Hellmuth Jr. in the quarterfinals.

Although he prefers high-stakes cash games, he has as of 2009 won over $2,500,000 in live poker tournaments. His 16 cashes at the WSOP account for $1,446,317 of those winnings. He was inducted into the Poker Hall of Fame in 2002.

According to the James McManus book Positively Fifth Street, Berman has bankrolled T. J. Cloutier in numerous poker tournaments, including the 2000 WSOP main event, where he finished 2nd.  The book All-In is about Berman's life.

Berman currently resides in Plymouth, Minnesota and has 4 children and 10 grandchildren.

World Series of Poker Bracelets

Publications

Berman co-authored I'm All In : Lyle Berman and the Birth of the World Poker Tour with Marvin Karlins.  The autobiography details Berman's life from his childhood to his life as an adult, covering his business ventures, his opinions on poker and Las Vegas, and his experiences with designing and developing the World Poker Tour into what it is today.

References

External links
 World Poker Tour profile
 Casino City Times book review
 Hendon Mob tournament results

1941 births
Living people
Carlson School of Management alumni
American poker players
World Series of Poker bracelet winners
Super Bowl of Poker event winners
Poker Hall of Fame inductees